John Elphinstone, also known as John Elphinston (1722 – 28 February 1785), was a senior British naval officer who worked closely with the Russian Navy after 1770, with approval from the Admiralty, during the period of naval reform under Russian Empress Catherine II. Together with the Scottish-born Samuel Greig, or Samuil Karlovich Greig (Самуил Карлович Грейг), as he was known in Russia, and Admiral Sir Charles Knowles, Elphinstone was a member of the naval staff, headed by Count Alexei Grigoryevich Orlov, which, although it lacked naval experience, was able to defeat the Turkish fleet at the Battle of Chesma Bay, near Chios Island, off the far western coast of Turkey.

Early life
He was born at Lopness, near Sanday in the Orkney Islands, the son of John Elphinstone and his wife Anne Williams and joined the Royal Navy.

He was promoted commander of the fireship  in 1757, serving under Commodore Hon. Richard Howe in his 1758 campaign against the French Channel ports. During one attack he was captured by the French.

After his release in 1759 he was made captain of the 20-gun  and took part in the capture of Quebec. In 1761 he was in command of  when she captured and destroyed the 32-gun French ship Félicité  at Scheveningen. Later that year Elphinstone captured two other French privateers. In 1762 Richmond sailed out to the West Indies and Elphinstone was put in charge of transport services during the siege of Havana. He afterwards brought back the 70-gun prize ship Infanta.

At the end of 1763 he commissioned the guard ship  at Plymouth, commanding her for three years.

Russian Service

Catherine II of Russia drew on the experience of British naval personnel through the networking in London of the British Ambassador in St. Petersburg from 1769 to 1771, Lieutenant-General Charles Cathcart, 9th Lord Cathcart. He was married to Jane Hamilton, but Jane's death in Saint Petersburg during an outbreak of the plague, prompted his return to Britain.

Elphinstone was one of a small number of British officers who joined the Catherine's Russian service in the summer of 1769, and was given the rank of rear-admiral. In 1770 he led a squadron from the Baltic to the Mediterranean to take part in the war against the Turks and participated in the defeat of a Turkish fleet in Battle of Chesma Bay.  He, however, was on such bad terms with his Russian superiors, particularly Count Aleksei Orlov, that he left the Russian service in July 1771.

Later life
John Elphinstone later held several further commands in the British Royal Navy, including that of the 74-gun  during Admiral Sir George Rodney's West Indian Campaign of 1779–80.

He died in 1785 in Broad Street, Carnaby Market, London. He had married Amelia Warburton, daughter of John Warburton, Somerset Herald, in 1750 and had seven sons and four daughters. They included:
 John, a post captain (1756 - 1801)
 Samuel William, who died as a captain in the Russian service (1758 - 1789)
 Thomas, who reached the same rank in the navy before his death (1765 - 1821)
 Robert Phillip Rodolph, who died as a post captain (1769 - 1822)
 Major-General Sir Howard Elphinstone (1773 - 1846)
 Molineux Roley (1777 - 1814)
 Anna-Charlotta-Maria (1763 - 1809), who married Captain Sir Francis John Hartwell
 Jane Alice Amelia (1767 - 1856) married John Dymoke in 1799
 Catherine Sarah (1775 -1851) married Thomas Roe in 1798

References

John Elphinston Papers Relating to the Russo-Turkish War, 1769-1850 (bulk 1769-1771): Finding Aid at Princeton University
"Scottish Influences in Russian History"
 Bartlett, Roger and Hughes, Lindsey, Dr. (eds.). Russian Society and Culture and the Long Eighteenth Century: Esays in Honour of Anthony G. Cross. Paperback, Lit Verlag, 2005. ; .
 Anthony G. Cross. By the Banks of the Neva: Chapters from the Lives and Careers of the British in Eighteenth-Century Russia. Cambridge: Cambridge University Press, 1997. (Anthony Cross was Professor of Slavonic Studies at the University of Cambridge from 1985 to 2004. Previously, he was Reader in Russian at the University of East Anglia and Roberts Professor of Russian at the University of Leeds. He was elected to the British Academy in 1989 and to the Russian Academy of the Humanities in 1996.)
 Schop Soler, Ana María. Un siglo de relaciones diplomáticas y comerciales entre España y Rusia : 1733-1833 Madrid: Ministerio de Asuntos Exteriores, Dirección General de Relaciones Culturales, D.L. (1984), 520 pages; 24 cm. In Spanish.
 Schop Soler, Ana María. Las relaciones entre España y Rusia en la época de Fernando VII (1808-1833), Barcelona, Universidad de Barcelona, (1975). In Spanish.
 Schop Soler, Ana María. Las relaciones entre España y Rusia en la época de Carlos IV Ana María, Schop Soler; prólogo de Carlos Seco Serrano. Editor: Barcelona: Cátedra de Historia General de España, 1971. xvii +196 pages; 21 cm. In Spanish. German Edition: Die Spanische-Russischen Beziehungen im 18. Jahrhundert. Wiesbaden: Otto Harrassowitz, (1970).

External links

Royal Navy officers
1722 births
1785 deaths
18th-century Royal Navy personnel
18th-century military personnel from the Russian Empire
People of the Russo-Turkish War (1768–1774)
Royal Navy personnel of the Seven Years' War
Royal Navy personnel of the American Revolutionary War